Kyro, Kyrö or KYRO may refer to:

 Kyrö Distillery Company in Finland
Tuomas Kyrö (born 1974), a Finnish author and cartoonist
 KYRO, a series of graphics chips made by PowerVR
 KYRO (AM), a radio station licensed to Potosi, Missouri, United States